American recording artist PnB Rock has released two studio albums, five mixtapes, one extended play (EP), and nineteen singles.

Albums

Studio albums

Mixtapes

EPs

Singles

As lead artist

As featured artist

Other charted and certified songs

Other guest appearances

Notes

References

Hip hop discographies
Discographies of American artists